"La Llorona"  (lit. "The weeping woman") is a Mexican folk song derived from the legend of La Llorona. There are many versions of the song. Its origins are obscure, but, around 1941, composer Andres Henestrosa mentioned hearing the song in the Isthmus of Tehuantepec. He popularized the song and may have added to the existing verses.

The legend of La Llorona is often conflated with La Malinche, the Nahua Princess and consort of Hernan Cortes, the conquistador of the Aztec Empire in Mexico. The La Llorona of the song drowned her children in a river in a rage at her unfaithful husband. As a spirit, she was condemned to wander the shores of the river forever searching for her dead children. In Latin America the song is associated with the Day of the Dead.

Composition

Salías del templo un día, Llorona,
Cuando al pasar yo te vi,
Salías del templo un día, Llorona,
Cuando al pasar yo te vi,
Hermoso huipil llevabas, Llorona,
Que la Virgen te creí.
Hermoso huipil llevabas, Llorona,
Que la Virgen te creí.

Todos me dicen el negro, Llorona,
negro, pero cariñoso.
Todos me dicen el negro, Llorona,
negro, pero cariñoso.
Yo soy como el chile verde, Llorona,
picante, pero sabroso.
Yo soy como el chile verde, Llorona,
picante, pero sabroso.

Ay que dolor, que penas, Llorona, Llorona, que penas las mias
Ay que dolor, que penas, Llorona, Llorona, que penas las mias
De que me sirvio el dolor, tu dime, si ya no me pertenecías
De que me sirvio el dolor, tu dime, si ya no me pertenecías

La pena y lo que no es pena, Llorona,
Todo es pena para mí,
La pena y lo que no es pena, Llorona,
Todo es pena para mí,
Ayer penaba/lloraba por verte, Llorona
Y hoy peno/lloro porque te vi.
Ayer penaba/lloraba por verte, Llorona
Y hoy peno/lloro porque te vi.

Ay de mí, Llorona, Llorona 
Llorona de azul celeste
Ay de mí, Llorona, Llorona 
Llorona de azul celeste
No dejaré de quererte, Llorona
Y, aunque la vida me cueste
No dejaré de quererte, Llorona
Y, aunque la vida me cueste

De las arcas de la fuente ¡Ay, Llorona!
corre el agua y nace la flor;
si preguntan quién canta ¡Ay, Llorona!
les dices que un desertor,
que viene de la campaña ¡Ay, Llorona!
(viene) en busca de su amor.

Me subí al pino más alto, Llorona,
A ver si te divisaba,
Me subí al pino más alto, Llorona,
A ver si te divisaba,
Como el pino era muy tierno, Llorona,
Al verme llorar, lloraba.
Como el pino era muy tierno, Llorona,
Al verme llorar, lloraba.

Cada vez que entra la noche, Llorona,
Me pongo a pensar y digo:
Cada vez que entra la noche, Llorona,
Me pongo a pensar y digo:
¿De qué me sirve la cama, Llorona,
si tú no duermes conmigo?
¿De qué me sirve la cama, Llorona,
si tú no duermes conmigo?

De la mar vino una carta, Llorona,
Que me mandó la sirena,
De la mar vino una carta, Llorona,
Que me mandó la sirena,
Y en la carta me decía, Llorona,
Quien tiene amor tiene pena.
Y en la carta me decía, Llorona,
Quien tiene amor tiene pena.

¡Ay de mí!, Llorona, Llorona,
Llorona llévame al río,
¡Ay de mí!, Llorona, Llorona,
Llorona llévame al río,
Tápame con tu rebozo, Llorona,
Porque me muero de frío.
Tápame con tu rebozo, Llorona,
Porque me muero de frío.

Dicen que no tengo duelo, Llorona,
Porque no me ven llorar.
Dicen que no tengo duelo, Llorona,
Porque no me ven llorar.
Hay muertos que no hacen ruido, Llorona,
¡Y es más grande su penar!
Hay muertos que no hacen ruido, Llorona,
¡Y es más grande su penar!

Si al cielo subir pudiera, Llorona,
Las estrellas te bajara,
Si al cielo subir pudiera, Llorona,
Las estrellas te bajara,
La luna a tus pies pusiera, Llorona,
Con el sol te coronara.
La luna a tus pies pusiera, Llorona,
Con el sol te coronara.

¡Ay de mí!, Llorona, Llorona,
Llorona de ayer y hoy
¡Ay de mí!, Llorona, Llorona,
Llorona de ayer y hoy
Ayer maravilla fui, Llorona,
Y ahora ni sombra soy.
Ayer maravilla fui, Llorona,
Y ahora ni sombra soy.

Ay de mí, Llorona, Llorona,
Llorona de negros ojos,
Ay de mí, Llorona, Llorona,
Llorona de negros ojos,
Ya con esta me despido, Llorona,
adorándote de hinojos.
Ya con esta me despido, Llorona,
adorándote de hinojos.

No sé qué tienen las flores, Llorona,
Las flores del camposanto,
No sé qué tienen las flores, Llorona,
Las flores del camposanto,
Que cuando las mueve el viento, Llorona,
Parece que están llorando.
Que cuando las mueve el viento, Llorona,
Parece que están llorando.

¡Ay de mí!, Llorona, Llorona,
tú eres mi chunca,
¡Ay de mí!, Llorona, Llorona,
tú eres mi chunca,
Me quitarán de quererte, Llorona,
pero de olvidarte nunca.
Me quitarán de quererte, Llorona,
pero de olvidarte nunca.

A un santo Cristo de fierro, Llorona,
Mis penas le conté yo,
A un santo Cristo de fierro, Llorona,
Mis penas le conté yo,
¿Cuáles no serían mis penas, Llorona,
que el santo Cristo lloró?
¿Cuáles no serían mis penas, Llorona,
que el santo Cristo lloró?

¡Ay de mí!, Llorona, Llorona,
Llorona de un campo lirio,
¡Ay de mí!, Llorona, Llorona,
Llorona de un campo lirio,
El que no sabe de amores, Llorona,
no sabe lo que es martirio.
El que no sabe de amores, Llorona,
no sabe lo que es martirio.

Dos besos llevo en el alma, Llorona,
que no se apartan de mí,
Dos besos llevo en el alma, Llorona,
que no se apartan de mí,
El último de mi madre, Llorona,
y el primero que te di.
El último de mi madre, Llorona,
y el primero que te di.

¡Ay de mí!, Llorona, Llorona,
Llorona, llévame a ver,
¡Ay de mí!, Llorona, Llorona,
Llorona, llévame a ver,
dónde de amores se olvida, Llorona,
y se empieza a padecer.
dónde de amores se olvida, Llorona,
y se empieza a padecer.

Alza los ojos y mira, Llorona,
allá en la mansión oscura
Alza los ojos y mira, Llorona,
allá en la mansión oscura
una estrella que fulgura, Llorona,
y tristemente suspira,
es Venus que se retira, Llorona,
celosa de tu hermosura.

¡Ay de mí!, Llorona, Llorona,
Llorona, que sí, que no.
¡Ay de mí!, Llorona, Llorona,
Llorona, que sí, que no.
La luz que me alumbraba, Llorona,
en tinieblas me dejó.
La luz que me alumbraba, Llorona,
en tinieblas me dejó.

Dicen que el primer amor, ¡Ay, Llorona!,
Es grande y es verdadero,
Dicen que el primer amor, ¡Ay, Llorona!,
Es grande y es verdadero,
Pero el último es mejor, ay, Llorona,
y más grande que el primero.
Pero el último es mejor, ay, Llorona,
y más grande que el primero.

¡Ay de mí!, Llorona, Llorona,
Llorona, dame una estrella.
¡Ay de mí!, Llorona, Llorona,
Llorona, dame una estrella.
¿Qué me importa que me digan, Llorona,
que tú ya no eres doncella?
¿Qué me importa que me digan, Llorona,
que tú ya no eres doncella?

No creas que porque canto, ¡Ay Llorona!,
tengo el corazón alegre.
No creas que porque canto, ¡Ay Llorona!,
tengo el corazón alegre.
También de dolor se canta, ¡Ay Llorona!,
¡Cuando llorar no se puede!
También de dolor se canta, ¡Ay Llorona!,
¡Cuando llorar no se puede!

¡Ay de mí!, Llorona, Llorona,
Llorona, dame tu amor.
¡Ay de mí!, Llorona, Llorona,
Llorona, dame tu amor.
El cielo puede esperar, ¡Ay, Llorona!,
pero mi corazón no.
El cielo puede esperar, ¡Ay, Llorona!,
pero mi corazón no.

Te quiero porque me gusta, Llorona,
y porque me da la gana,
Te quiero porque me gusta, Llorona,
y porque me da la gana,
Te quiero porque me sale, Llorona,
de las entrañas del alma.
Te quiero porque me sale, Llorona,
de las entrañas del alma.

Si porque te quiero, quieres, Llorona,
quieres que te quiera más.
Si porque te quiero, quieres, Llorona,
quieres que te quiera más.
Si ya te he dado mi vida, Llorona,
¿Qué más quieres?, ¿Quieres más?
Si ya te he dado mi vida, Llorona,
¿Qué más quieres?, ¿Quieres más?

¡Ay de mí!, Llorona, Llorona,
Llorona, mi cielo lindo.
¡Ay de mí!, Llorona, Llorona,
Llorona, mi cielo lindo.
Ayer te vi penando, Llorona,
debajo de un tamarindo.
Ayer te vi penando, Llorona,
debajo de un tamarindo.

¡Ay de mí!, Llorona, Llorona,
Llorona, mucho te adoro.
¡Ay de mí!, Llorona, Llorona,
Llorona, mucho te adoro.
Tú no sabes si te quiero, Llorona,
porque no sabes que lloro.
Tú no sabes si te quiero, Llorona,
porque no sabes que lloro.

Si porque te quiero, quieres, Llorona,
que yo la muerte reciba,
Si porque te quiero, quieres, Llorona,
que yo la muerte reciba,
Que se haga tu voluntad, Llorona,
que muera por que otro viva.
Que se haga tu voluntad, Llorona,
que muera por que otro viva.

You came out of the temple one day, Llorona,
I saw you when you passed,
You came out of the temple one day, Llorona,
I saw you when you passed,
A beautiful dress you wore, Llorona,
I thought you were the Virgin
A beautiful dress you wore, Llorona,
I thought you were the Virgin

Everyone calls me 'the black', Llorona
Black but loving
Everyone calls me 'the black', Llorona
Black but loving
I am like the green chili pepper, Llorona
spicy, but tasty
I am like the green chili pepper, Llorona
spicy, but tasty

Oh what pain, what sorrows, Llorona, Llorona, what sorrows of mine
Oh what pain, what sorrows, Llorona, Llorona, what sorrows of mine
Of what use was the pain, you tell me, if you no longer belonged to me
Of what use was the pain, you tell me, if you no longer belonged to me

(What it is) sorrow and what is not sorrow, Llorona
Everything is sorrow for me
(What it is) sorrow and what is not sorrow, Llorona
Everything is sorrow for me
Yesterday I cried to see you, Llorona
And Today I cry because I saw you
Yesterday I cried to see you, Llorona
And Today I cry because I saw you

Alas, Llorona, Llorona, Llorona of sky-blue
Alas, Llorona, Llorona, Llorona of sky-blue
Although it costs me my life, Llorona
I will not stop loving you
Although it costs me my life, Llorona
I will not stop loving you

From the basin of the fountain – Alas, Llorona!
water flows and the flower is born;
If they ask who sings – Alas, Llorona!
Tell them that it's a deserter
Who comes from the fight – Alas, Llorona! 
(Comes) in search of his love

I climbed to the highest pine tree, Llorona,
To see if I could spot you
I climbed to the highest pine tree, Llorona,
To see if I could spot you
As the pine was so gentle, Llorona,
At seeing me cry, it cried
As the pine was so gentle, Llorona,
At seeing me cry, it cried

Each time night falls, Llorona,
I begin to think, and I say:
Each time night falls, Llorona,
I begin to think, and I say:
What's the point of my bed, Llorona,
if you do not sleep with me?
What's the point of my bed, Llorona,
if you do not sleep with me?

From the sea came a letter, Llorona,
That the mermaid sent to me,
From the sea came a letter, Llorona,
That the mermaid sent to me,
And in the letter she said to me, Llorona
Whoever has love also has pain.
And in the letter she said to me, Llorona
Whoever has love also has pain.

Alas!, Llorona, Llorona,
Llorona take me to the river,
Alas!, Llorona, Llorona,
Llorona take me to the river,
Cover me with your shawl, Llorona
Because I am dying of cold.
Cover me with your shawl, Llorona
Because I am dying of cold.

They say that I don't mourn, Llorona
Because they don't see me cry.
They say that I don't mourn, Llorona
Because they don't see me cry.
There are dead that do not make noise, Llorona,
And their pain is much greater!
There are dead that do not make noise, Llorona,
And their pain is much greater!

If I could climb to the sky, Llorona,
I'd lower the stars to you,
If I could climb to the sky, Llorona,
I'd lower the stars to you,
The Moon at your feet I'd put, Llorona
With the sun I'd crown you
The Moon at your feet I'd put, Llorona
With the sun I'd crown you

Alas!, Llorona, Llorona,
Llorona of yesterday and today.
Alas!, Llorona, Llorona,
Llorona of yesterday and today.
Yesterday I was a marvel, Llorona
And today I'm not even a shadow.
Yesterday I was a marvel, Llorona
And today I'm not even a shadow.

Alas!, Llorona, Llorona,
Llorona of the black eyes,
Alas!, Llorona, Llorona,
Llorona of the black eyes,
With this one [verse] I say goodbye, Llorona
worshipping you on my knees.
With this one [verse] I say goodbye, Llorona
worshipping you on my knees.

I don't know what's in the flowers, Llorona,
The flowers from the cemetery,
I don't know what's in the flowers, Llorona,
The flowers from the cemetery,
When they are moved by the wind, Llorona,
they seem to be crying
When they are moved by the wind, Llorona,
they seem to be crying

Alas!, Llorona, Llorona,
You are my sweetheart,
Alas!, Llorona, Llorona,
You are my sweetheart,
They'll stop me from loving you, Llorona
But never I'll forget you.
They'll stop me from loving you, Llorona
But never I'll forget you.

To a holy iron Christ [Crucifix], Llorona,
I told to him my sins.
To a holy iron Christ [Crucifix], Llorona,
I told to him my sins.
Which would not be my sorrows, Llorona,
that the holy Christ wept?
Which would not be my sorrows, Llorona,
that the holy Christ wept?

Alas!, Llorona, Llorona,
Llorona of a lily field,
Alas!, Llorona, Llorona,
Llorona of a lily field,
He who doesn't know love, Llorona,
doesn't know what martyrdom is.
He who doesn't know love, Llorona,
doesn't know what martyrdom is.

I carry two kisses in my soul, Llorona,
that will never leave me,
I carry two kisses in my soul, Llorona,
that will never leave me,
The last one from my mother, Llorona,
and the first one I gave to you.
The last one from my mother, Llorona,
and the first one I gave to you.

Alas!, Llorona, Llorona,
Llorona, take me to see,
Alas!, Llorona, Llorona,
Llorona, take me to see,
The place where all love is forgotten, Llorona,
and suffering begins.
The place where all love is forgotten, Llorona,
and suffering begins.

Lift up your eyes and look, Llorona,
There in the dark sky,
Lift up your eyes and look, Llorona,
There in the dark sky,
a star that glares, Llorona,
and sadly sighs,
it's Venus that withdraws, Llorona
jealous of your beauty.

Alas!, Llorona, Llorona,
Llorona, you say yes, you say not.
Alas!, Llorona, Llorona,
Llorona, you say yes, you say not.
The light that illuminated me, Llorona
left me in the darkness.
The light that illuminated me, Llorona
left me in the darkness.

They say that the first love, Alas Llorona!
is great and true, 
They say that the first love, Alas Llorona!
is great and true, 
but the last love is better, Alas Llorona!
and greater than the first.
but the last love is better, Alas Llorona!
and greater than the first.

Alas!, Llorona, Llorona,
Llorona, give me a star.
Alas!, Llorona, Llorona,
Llorona, give me a star.
What do I care if they say to me, Llorona,
that you no longer are a virgin maid?
What do I care if they say to me, Llorona,
that you no longer are a virgin maid?

Don't think that because I sing, Alas Llorona!,
my heart is joyful.
Don't think that because I sing, Alas Llorona!,
my heart is joyful.
One also sings from pain, Alas Llorona!,
When one can not cry!
One also sings from pain, Alas Llorona!,
When one can not cry!

Alas!, Llorona, Llorona,
Llorona, give me your love.
Alas!, Llorona, Llorona,
Llorona, give me your love.
Heaven can wait, Alas, Llorona!,
but my heart cannot.
Heaven can wait, Alas, Llorona!,
but my heart cannot.

I love you because I like it, Llorona,
and because I feel like it.
I love you because I like it, Llorona,
and because I feel like it.
I love you because it emerges, Llorona,
from the inside of my soul.
I love you because it emerges, Llorona,
from the inside of my soul.

If because I love you, you want, Llorona,
you want me to love you more.
If because I love you, you want, Llorona,
you want me to love you more.
If I have already given my life to you, Llorona,
What more do you want?, You want more?
If I have already given my life to you, Llorona,
What more do you want?, You want more?

Alas!, Llorona, Llorona,
Llorona, my darling (lit beautiful sky)
Alas!, Llorona, Llorona,
Llorona, my darling (lit beautiful sky)
Yesterday I saw you grieving, Llorona,
Under a tamarind tree
Yesterday I saw you grieving, Llorona,
Under a tamarind tree

Alas!, Llorona, Llorona,
Llorona, I adore you so much.
Alas!, Llorona, Llorona,
Llorona, I adore you so much.
You don't know that I love you, Llorona,
because you don't know I weep (for you).
You don't know that I love you, Llorona,
because you don't know I weep (for you).

If because I love you, you want, Llorona,
That you want me to die.
If because I love you, you want, Llorona,
That you want me to die.
Let your will be done, Llorona,
let me die so someone else lives.
Let your will be done, Llorona,
let me die so someone else lives.

Interpretations of "La Llorona"

One popular interpretation of the song is of the singer feeling trapped by a woman (La Llorona) who has fallen in love with him. If he even thinks about leaving her, she weeps. He tries everything in his power to leave her, but he is trapped by pity for the woman. He wishes to be taken down to the river to be drowned, and so then his suffering can finally end. The suffering that the man goes through from being trapped in a relationship with the woman in a way parallels the suffering that the woman in the legend goes through from having her lover leave her.

Another interpretation following the lyrics is that the "llorona" represents the singer's deceased or abandoned spouse which would explain the morbid references throughout the song and why the lover never seems to actually try to reach her. Examples include "duelo" (mourning), and "campo santo" (cemetery).

The Llorona is traditionally a Banshee-like folk ghost that haunts her lover after having drowned her children, and who now cries for her dead children. She foretells death to those who see it. There are many variations to the verses of the song that have been adapted for different audiences throughout the years. The song is not considered a love song because of its overall sad tones and has been used for Día de Muertos festivities.

Folklorists of Mesoamerica theorize that La Llorona represents a survival of the basic Mesoamerican myth called, "Why the Earth Eats the Dead."

Popular covers
"La Llorona" falls under the genre of Mexican folklore and ranchera because of its origins as a legend and its heavy use of the guitar, respectively. One of the most famous contemporary versions of the song is performed by Mexican star Eugenia León.

The Spanish singer Raphael recorded La Llorona in the mid-1960s. The famous Azerbaijani singer Rashid Beibutov sang his version in the 60s. Joan Baez recorded La Llorona on her Gracias a la Vida album, originally released in March 1974. 

In 2006, Dulce Pontes recorded a version in Portuguese, A chorona, on her album "O Coração Tem Três Portas".

Canadian guitarist Jesse Cook covered the song on his 2007 album Frontiers, where it is sung by Amanda Martinez.

Mexican singer Natalia Lafourcade covered the song on her album Musas Volumen 2 released in 2018.

Singer Ángela Aguilar, daughter of Pepe Aguilar, covered the song on her album Primero Soy Mexicana, also released in 2018. She later performed it at the 19th Annual Latin Grammy Awards with Aida Cuevas and Natalia Lafourcade.

Emilie-Claire Barlow covered the song on her 11th album Clear Day. Recorded with the Metropole Orkest conducted by Jules Buckley, this version features lyrics translated to the French as well as an original verse. It was arranged for orchestra by Emilie-Claire Barlow and Steve Webster;

In 2016, Gisela João recorded a cover of the song, which was released as the closing track of her second studio album, Nua. In 2018, Spanish singer Alba Reche covered the song for Gala 6 of series 10 of Spanish TV show Operación Triunfo

Chavela Vargas
The late Chavela Vargas is known throughout the Americas for her songs of struggle, defiance, and triumph. When Vargas recorded the song back in the 1990s, she remained loyal to the ranchera genre by making the guitar the primary instrument in the song. Although Vargas did remain true to the typical ranchera sound, she also created her own unique sound in the process. Carlos Gutierrez of Cinema Tropical explains "she took ranchero music and made the music her own. She stripped the music from the trumpet and other arrangements."

Popular culture influence

Frida film
The song "La Llorona" appears in the film Frida (2002), about Frida Kahlo, directed by Julie Taymor and starring Mexican actress Salma Hayek. Chavela Vargas was invited for a special appearance, singing her version of "La Llorona". It is well known that Vargas was a close friend and a frequent house guest of Frida Kahlo and her husband Diego Rivera. Vargas was so close to Kahlo, that a short-lasting affair is speculated to have occurred between the two before Kahlo married Rivera.

In the film, Vargas plays the role of a ghost who consoles Kahlo. Kahlo had been drinking in a bar for some time when she notices a ghost sitting down at a nearby table. A black shawl, which references the song lyrics, is wrapped around the ghost and Kahlo initially is quite hesitant to approach her. As Kahlo is about to sit next to the ghost, the ghost reveals her face to Kahlo. Kahlo continues to listen to Vargas’ interpretation of the song, and becomes overwhelmed by her memories and begins to cry. Kahlo begins to remember the car accident that changed her life and also her turbulent past with her husband.

Coco film
The song "La Llorona" is featured in the 2017 Disney-Pixar film Coco; it is performed by Alanna Ubach as Imelda Rivera and Antonio Sol in a guest appearance as Ernesto de la Cruz in the English version and Angelica Vale and Marco Antonio Solis in the Spanish version. In the film, Imelda sings the song during the sunrise concert as she attempts to evade Ernesto who sings the song in duet with her. The song is also heard in the beginning, sung by a rowdy group of drunkards during the "No music!" montage, and briefly played by a mariachi guitarist getting a shoe shine from Miguel.

Penny Dreadful: City of Angels
Varga's song is featured in the opening and closing scenes of "Santa Muerte", the pilot episode of Penny Dreadful: City of Angels.

La Llorona film
A new arrangement of the song is heard during the end credits of the 2019 Guatemalan film La Llorona, written and directed by Jayro Bustamante. The lyrics are almost completely different from the best known version. In keeping with the film, this version abandons the legend in favor of a more political use of the song, referring to the genocide of the Maya-Ixil people of the Guatemalan highland during that country's civil war (1960s–1980s).

References

Citations

Bibliography

"Defiant singer was a cultural force in Mexico". Los Angeles Times. 6 August 2012.
Munoz, Lorena. "With a Song in Her Soul". Los Angeles Times. 25 June 2010.
"Portraits of Lila Downs Singing La Llorona at Oaxaca Concert". Oaxaca Culture. 6 November 2011.
Whitney, Joel. "Wise Latina". Guernica Magazine. 1 October 2009.

Year of song unknown
Mexican folk songs
La Llorona
Songs about ghosts